The Toronto-Niagara Bike Train (known in short as "The Bike Train") is an initiative in Southern Ontario allowing cyclists to travel by train on Via Rail to destinations across Ontario including Toronto, Niagara Falls, St. Catharines, and North Bay, as well as the city of Montreal in Quebec. 2009 saw an expansion of the Bike Train Initiative, with new routes and more weekends of service.

The Bike Train initiative is independently coordinated, promoted, and ticketed service, utilizing existing Via Rail passenger trains, with an additional baggage car containing bike racks for 56 bicycles. Each passenger ticket for scheduled Bike Train departures includes both a passenger seat and a bike rack reservation.

The Bike Train initiative was developed in response to the growing tourism demand and economic opportunity for improved transportation access for cyclists between Toronto and the Niagara Region.

History 

Project founder Justin Lafontaine conceptualized the idea for the Toronto-Niagara Bike Train Initiative during a trip to the Niagara Region in April 2006. On that trip, he accompanied the Waterfront Regeneration Trust and several others from the region on their annual Lake Ontario Waterfront Trail cycle tour from Niagara-on-the-Lake, Ontario to Grimsby, Ontario. Impressed with the many trails, diverse landscapes, towns, cities and attractions, he began planning another trip to the region.

When discussing the opportunities for cycle tourism with a fellow rider, Justin discovered that there was no convenient transportation option for cyclists between Toronto and the Niagara Region; the existing train service did not provide baggage capacity, and buses usually require bikes to be boxed prior to loading. This led him to Via Rail Canada and other partners to discuss the potential to introduce a Bike Train service – a concept that garnered support from government contacts, tourism organizations, small businesses, media and the public.

A project proposal was subsequently developed for the Ontario Ministry of Tourism - Investment Development Office and funding for the Pilot Year of the Toronto-Niagara Bike Train Initiative was announced in January 2007.

In 2008, The Bike Train received further funding support from the Ontario Ministry of the Environment and the Friends of the Greenbelt Foundation.

In 2009, with the support from the Ontario Trillium Foundation, Friends of the Greenbelt Foundation and the Ontario Ministry of Tourism the Bike Train expanded to two new routes. The Ontario North route took passengers from Toronto to North Bay using the Ontario Northland's passenger rail service for a pilot weekend in August. The new Montreal - Toronto route provided daily service between Canada's two biggest cities.

Partners and supporters

Previous funding partners 
Ontario Ministry of Tourism
Friends of the Greenbelt Foundation
Ontario Trillium Foundation

Lead organizations 
Transportation Options
Waterfront Regeneration Trust
Niagara-on-the-Lake Chamber of Commerce
Via Rail Canada

Project partners 
City of Toronto government
Via Rail Canada
Ontario Northland Railway

Promotional partners 
Ontario Tourism Marketing Partnership
Pedal Magazine
Wine Council of Ontario

Legal advisor 
Michael Carey, Lawyer, Macdonald Sager Manis LLP Cabuna.com

Other supporters 

Brock University
City of St. Catharines, Ontario
Cycle Ontario
Grimsby Chamber of Commerce
Grimsby Downtown Improvement Area
Grimsby Economic Development Committee
I Bike T.O.
Niagara Falls Downtown BIA
Niagara Falls Tourism
Niagara Freewheelers Bicycle Touring Club
Niagara Fruit Education Centre
Niagara Parks Commission
Regional Municipality of Niagara
Regional Niagara Bicycling Committee
Toronto Metropolitan University
Toronto Coalition for Active Transportation (TCAT)
Toronto Cyclists Union
Tourism Toronto

External links 
 Bike Train Website (biketrain.ca)

References 

Transport in Toronto
Rail transport in the Regional Municipality of Niagara
Cycling in Toronto